Buttel may refer to:

 Büttel, German municipality
 Frederick H. Buttel (1948–2005), American professor of rural sociology

See also
 Buttle (disambiguation)
 Butel, Macedonian municipality